Simione Tufui Fehoko (born November 5, 1997) is an American football wide receiver for the Dallas Cowboys of the National Football League (NFL). He played college football at Stanford.

Early years
Fehoko played football at Brighton High School in Cottonwood Heights, Utah. As a junior he led the state in receiving, posting 65 receptions for 1,656 yards and 24 receiving touchdowns (state record).

As a senior, he tallied 59 receptions for 1,495 yards and 16 receiving touchdowns. He was a two-time All-state selection and was named to the 2015 USA Today All-USA high school football second-team. He set the state record for career receiving yards (3,571) and career receiving touchdowns (41). He was a four star recruit coming out of high school and committed to Stanford University to play college football.

Fehoko also lettered in basketball.

College career
After a two-year LDS mission in Seoul, Korea, Fehoko began his freshman season in 2018. He played in the last 4 games as a backup, making one reception for 6 yards.

As a sophomore, he appeared in 12 games with one start. He registered 24 receptions for 566 yards (fourth on the team), a 23.58-yard average per reception (school record) and 6 receiving touchdowns (second on the team). He had 3 receptions for 97 receiving yards and 2 touchdowns against the University of Arizona. He made 3 receptions for 92 yard and 2 touchdowns against Washington State University.

As a junior in 2020, the football season was reduced to 6 games due to the COVID-19 pandemic. He played in all 6 games with 5 starts, leading the team with 37 receptions for 574 yards, a 15.5-yard average per reception and 3 touchdowns, while being named to the All-Pac-12 First-team. He had 6 receptions for 100 yards against Oregon State University. He tallied 16 receptions (school record), 230 receiving yards (third in school history) and 3 receiving touchdowns in the double-overtime win over UCLA, 48-47.

On August 28, 2020, he announced that he would forgo his senior season in order to enter the 2021 NFL Draft. He finished his college career with 62 receptions for 1,146 yards, an 18.5-yard average per reception (third in school history), 9 receiving touchdowns and 77% of his total receptions (48) resulted in either a first down or a touchdown.

Professional career

Fehoko was selected by the Dallas Cowboys in the fifth round (179th overall) of the 2021 NFL Draft. He signed his four-year rookie contract on May 13, 2021.

On October 15, 2022, Fehoko was placed on injured reserve.

Personal life
His cousin Breiden Fehoko plays defensive end in the NFL for the Los Angeles Chargers.

References

External links
 Stanford Cardinal bio

1997 births
Living people
Players of American football from Salt Lake City
American football wide receivers
Stanford Cardinal football players
American people of Tongan descent
American Mormon missionaries in South Korea
Latter Day Saints from Utah
Dallas Cowboys players